Albert John Sands (6 October 1902 – 20 July 1974) was an Australian rules footballer who played with Footscray in the Victorian Football League (VFL).

A follower, Sands played six consecutive games for Footscray in their first season in the VFL before getting injured and then being hospitalised with appendicitis.

Sands later served in the Australian Army and then the Royal Australian Navy during World War II.

Notes

External links 
		

1902 births
1974 deaths
Australian rules footballers from Victoria (Australia)
Western Bulldogs players